Events from the year 1824 in Russia

Incumbents
 Monarch – Alexander I

Events

 Mnemozina first published
 Floods in Saint Petersburg which caused 300 casualties.

Births

Deaths

References

1824 in Russia
Years of the 19th century in the Russian Empire